The 2020 Viennese state election was held on 11 October 2020 to elect the members of the Gemeinderat and Landtag of Vienna. The outgoing government was a coalition of the Social Democratic Party (SPÖ) and The Greens.

The SPÖ remained comfortably in first place with small gains. Conversely, the previously second-placed Freedom Party of Austria (FPÖ) suffered a catastrophic defeat, losing 80% of its votes compared to 2015 and becoming the smallest party in the legislature. The Austrian People's Party (ÖVP) moved into second place after more than doubling its vote share. The Greens recorded their best result to date, just under 15%. NEOS – The New Austria (NEOS) moved into fourth place with minor gains. Team HC Strache fell short of the 5% electoral threshold to enter the Gemeinderat and Landtag.

On 27 October, Mayor and Governor Michael Ludwig announced that the SPÖ would seek a coalition with NEOS. Negotiations were successful and the parties presented their coalition pact on 17 November. Ludwig was re-elected as Mayor by the Gemeinderat and Landtag on 24 November, and the new government was sworn in the same day.

Background
The Viennese constitution mandates that cabinet positions in the city government (city councillors) be allocated between parties proportionally in accordance with the share of votes won by each; this is known as Proporz. The number of city councillors is voted upon by the Landtag after each election, and may legally vary between nine and fifteen. City councillors are divided into two groups – "senior" councillors, who hold a cabinet portfolio, and "non-executive" councillors who do not. Non-executive councillors may vote in cabinet meetings, but do not otherwise hold any government responsibility. In practice, parties seek to form a coalition which holds a majority in both the Landtag and city government. City councillors bound to the coalition become senior councillors, while the opposition are relegated to non-executive status.

In the 2015 state election, the SPÖ and ÖVP both suffered losses, with the former recording its worst result since 1996 and the latter its worst ever. This came to the benefit of the FPÖ, which achieved its best ever result, and NEOS, which entered the Landtag for the first time. The SPÖ won seven councillors, the FPÖ four, the Greens one, and the ÖVP one. The SPÖ renewed its coalition with the Greens.

In August 2017, Mayor and Governor Michael Häupl announced his impending retirement. He had served since 1994. He did not seek re-election as head of the Vienna SPÖ in January 2018, and was succeeded by long-serving city councillor Michael Ludwig. Häupl resigned as Mayor and Governor on 24 May 2018, and Ludwig was subsequently elected as his replacement by the Gemeinderat and Landtag. He was sworn in on 29 May.

The Ibiza affair in May 2019 led to the resignation of Vice-Chancellor Heinz-Christian Strache and a general decline in support for the FPÖ nationally, which was seen in the 2019 federal election and subsequent state elections in Vorarlberg, Styria, and Burgenland. Strache resigned from all political offices in November 2019, but in early 2020 announced he would join The Alliance for Austria to run in the Viennese state election. The party subsequently adopted the name Team HC Strache – Alliance for Austria.

Electoral system
The 100 seats of the Gemeinderat and Landtag of Vienna are elected via open list proportional representation in a two-step process. The seats are distributed between eighteen multi-member constituencies. For parties to receive any representation in the Landtag, they must either win at least one seat in a constituency directly, or clear a 5 percent state-wide electoral threshold. Seats are distributed in constituencies according to the modified Hare quota, with any remaining seats allocated at the state level to create a greater degree of proportionality between a party's vote share and its share of seats.

After the 2015 election, a minor reform to the electoral system was passed, changing the formula for distribution of seats in constituencies. The new formula increases the number of votes required to win a seat in a constituency, resulting in fewer seats being distributed to parties through constituencies and more distributed on the state level. This reform was seen as beneficial to minor parties, which are unlikely to win more than a few seats in constituencies, and must rely on state-level distribution for most of their representation.

Election statistics
A total of 1,133,010 people were eligible to vote in the state election, among them 597,027 women and 535,983 men. Only Austrian citizens aged 16 or older on election day were eligible. For the district council elections held on the same day, a total of 1,362,789 voters were eligible; this number is higher than for the state election as EU citizens aged over 16 are eligible to vote in municipal elections. Among this number were 712,131 women and 650,658 men.

A total of 1,494 polling stations were set up on election day. As many as 500,000 absentee/postal ballots were expected to be issued for the election. Requesting a postal ballot in person was permitted from 14 September, with the option to cast the vote early in-person right after requesting it at Vienna's various election offices. On 9 October, the City of Vienna announced that a final total of 382,214 absentee/postal ballots were issued for the election, of which 360,563 were issued to Austrian citizens for the Gemeinderat and Landtag election and an additional 21,651 to EU citizens who are eligible to vote only in the district elections. This set a new record for Vienna, topping the 266,150 voting cards issued in Vienna for the 2019 Austrian legislative election.

Contesting parties
The table below lists parties represented in the previous Landtag.

In addition to the parties already represented in the Landtag, seven parties collected enough signatures to be placed on the ballot.

 Team HC Strache – Alliance for Austria (HC)
 LEFT (LINKS)
 Social Austria of the Future (SÖZ)
 Beer Party of Austria (BIER)
 Volt Austria (Volt) – on the ballot only in Centre and Inner West
 We for Floridsdorf (WIFF) – on the ballot only in Floridsdorf
 Pro23 – List Ernst Paleta (PRO) – on the ballot only in Liesing

Lead candidates

Opinion polling

Graphical summary

Party polling

Better Mayor polling

Results

Results by constituency

Analysis
The FPÖ only won one-fifth as many votes as it had in 2015; analysis by SORA indicated that 100,000 people who gave their vote to the FPÖ in 2015 did not vote in 2020. The party lost 43,000 votes to the ÖVP, 32,000 to the SPÖ, and 17,000 to Team HC. Overall, the FPÖ gained less than 1,000 votes from other parties compared to 2015.

Polling indicated that federal politics was a major factor among the majority of voters of almost all parties, including 74% of ÖVP voters, and 56–57% of Green, NEOS, and FPÖ voters. By contrast, only 36% of SPÖ voters stated that federal politics was a major factor in their choice.

Analysis by SORA indicated strong voting trends in different age groups, with the SPÖ and ÖVP strongest among older voters, and the Greens and NEOS stronger among younger voters. In contrast to the overall trend, the ÖVP improved its performance only negligibly among voters under 29, winning just 7%. The FPÖ crashed from 25% to 5%, with the difference made up by gains for the Greens (27%) and minor parties (12%). The Greens also placed second among 30-44 year olds at 19% to the ÖVP's 17%, while NEOS and the FPÖ recorded their best results among this demographic at 11% and 9%, respectively.

According to analysis published by the OGM Institute, 20% of voters of Turkish immigrant background voted for Social Austria of the Future (SÖZ), making it the second-most popular party among this demographic. SÖZ, a minor party representing immigrant interests, won just 1.2% of the vote overall. The SPÖ also performed better among Turkish immigrants than the overall electorate, with all other parties performing worse, particularly the ÖVP (10%) and Greens (9%). Voters of Serbian immigrant background voted moderately more strongly for the SPÖ, FPÖ, and Team HC than the general electorate.

Aftermath
Greens leader Birgit Hebein stated the result was a "very clear mandate" for a renewal of the incumbent SPÖ–Green government. NEOS lead candidate Christoph Wiederkehr expressed his party's desire to join the state government, naming increased funding for education, economic relief, transparency, and a focus on the city's peripheral regions as conditions for a coalition.

FPÖ lead candidate Dominik Nepp described the loss as "painful", but attributed it to residue from the Ibiza affair. He stated he would have to analyse the full result before considering whether he would resign as regional party leader. Nepp and federal leader Norbert Hofer later confirmed they would each retain their positions despite the disastrous defeat. Heinz-Christian Strache blamed the FPÖ for his new party's failure to enter the Gemeinderat and Landtag, accusing them of "heartlessly causing the split".

Political scientist Thomas Hofer stated that an SPÖ–ÖVP government was unlikely due to potential conflict with the federal government, which makes it unfavourable for the ÖVP. He also believed the SPÖ were unlikely to cede the finance ministry to Gernot Blümel, which would be a major stumbling block. Fellow political scientist Kathrin Stainer-Hämmerle described a potential SPÖ–NEOS government as a "counter-model" to the federal ÖVP–Green government, offering the public an alternative. Concurring with commentary from the Kurier, she also believed that the result weakened the position of federal SPÖ leader Pamela Rendi-Wagner while confirming the strength of the party's popular state governors Ludwig, Hans Peter Doskozil, and Peter Kaiser. She questioned the FPÖ's choice to downplay the consequences of the result, speculating that the party may be privately considering a change in leadership on both the state and federal level.

Government formation
Mayor Michael Ludwig declined to commit to negotiations with any particular party, stating he was open to negotiations with all except the FPÖ. Mathematically, the SPÖ could form a majority with any one of the other parties. Ludwig stated that social cohesion and good cooperation are the "basic premise" for any coalition, and that he wanted talks to begin quickly.

Alexander Nikolai and Ernst Nevrivy, chairmen of the local SPÖ in Leopoldstadt and Donaustadt, voiced their support for an SPÖ–NEOS government. They criticised the conduct of the Greens during the previous term, claiming they had diverged from the coalition agreement, and expressed their belief that the SPÖ could cooperate well with NEOS. By contrast, former mayor Michael Häupl spoke out in favour of a renewed coalition with the Greens, stating that NEOS diverged too much from the SPÖ on economic policy to work together effectively. He also stated that the ÖVP, since their "turquoise" turn, had moved too far from the SPÖ to be viable partners in government.

Exploratory talks with NEOS, the Greens, and the ÖVP were held from 19 to 21 October. Ludwig stated his desire to have a coalition agreement in place by mid-November. He elaborated on his party's policy positions going into negotiations, rejecting the possibility of privatizing healthcare or withdrawing housing subsidies. NEOS leader Wiederkehr and Greens leader Hebein both described their respective talks as productive, and were optimistic about prospects of entering government with the SPÖ. ÖVP leader Blümel stated discussions were "constructive" but that there were "differences" between the two parties, especially in policy areas such as minimum wage, pensions, and the ÖVP's demand that knowledge of the German language be required for access to public housing. After this, commentators speculated that chances of an SPÖ–ÖVP coalition were very low, while the Greens and NEOS were both considered equally viable options.

On 27 October, Ludwig announced that the SPÖ would seek coalition negotiations with NEOS. He stated that priority areas would be responding to the COVID-19 pandemic, expanding the healthcare sector, strengthening business, improving education, and combating climate change. Explaining his decision, he said that while the Greens and SPÖ's policy was similar, they placed emphasis on different areas. He expressed that while he was satisfied with the accomplishments of the SPÖ–Green government, "the time seems ripe to try something new." He stated that the vote in the SPÖ presidium was unanimous, while only two members of the party executive voted against. NEOS leader Wiederkehr welcomed the announcement, stating his focus on improving education, job creation, and addressing the pandemic. He expressed his hope for a "reform coalition" between the two parties.

Greens leader Hebein voiced her disappointment and her concerns that a government with NEOS could take conservative positions on the health system and climate change. The Viennese ÖVP stated that the decision was predictable, as a coalition with NEOS was "the most convenient route with the weakest partner". They claimed that the SPÖ had been inflexible and unwilling to compromise during exploratory talks. FPÖ leader Nepp accused the other parties of playing a game of "who can offer less", and claimed his party would be the only serious opposition force in the next legislative period. The Viennese branch of the Socialist Youth spoke out against going into government with NEOS, with chairwoman Fiona Herzog describing the decision as "madness". She criticised NEOS's record on trade unions and endorsed coalition with the Greens, stating they have "always proved to be a good coalition partner." She stated that she was one of the two members of the party executive to vote against the coalition, with the other vote against coming from a representative of SPÖ's student branch.

The bulk of negotiations concluded by 12 November, with the parties agreeing on various policy areas. The coalition agreement was finalised and presented on 17 November.

Ludwig was re-elected as Mayor by the Gemeinderat and Landtag on 24 November, receiving 60 votes. This figure accounted for the 54 seats of the new governing coalition plus six votes from the opposition. Ludwig and his new government was sworn in shortly thereafter. NEOS leader Wiederkehr, the sole city councillor for his party, became Vice Mayor and councillor for education.

City councillors
The composition of the city councillors after the election are as follows:

Notes

References

2020 elections in Austria
State elections in Austria
October 2020 events in Austria
Viennese state election
Politics of Vienna